Naryab/Nariäb(نرياب)  is a town and union council of Tehsil Thal  Hangu District in Khyber Pakhtunkhwa, Pakistan. Its main Pashtun tribe is Bangash It belongs to Kohat Division. Its history dates back to at least 1770. The main tribe residing is Badha Khel.

Geography 
A small dam sits in the upper area of Naryab, which is used by local farmers for irrigation.

Naryab is bordered by Zargari to the north, Kahi to the east, Tora Wari to the west, and Doaba to the south. Doaba has recently become a trade center for the people of Naryab and other surrounding villages.

Development 
Issues facing Naryab include construction of roads and transportation, electricity, medical facilities and formal education. Naryab Road has become a point of contention between JUI-F and PTI, the two big political parties. Gas royalties above five crore rupees have been issued to Tehsil Thall for the construction of Naryab Road. The two parties are contesting the use of the funds. The struggle delayed construction for more than three years. The disagreement became prominent on social media. Prominent social media group Naryab Khabroona played an important role in raising various issues especially road construction. Naryab Khabroona is still playing a role in raising the core issues of Naryab.

Another main problem of Naryab is electricity. After the formation of PTI's government in Khyber-Pakhtunkhwa and the PML-N government, the electricity was disconnected for non-payment. Villagers claim that before 2013, WAPDA (electric utility) was delivering only 10 volts for two hours in 24 hours, making it unreasonable to pay more than two hundred thousand rupees for such limited service
however in recent years the people of naryab use electric generators and mainly use solar panels and thus the electricity of Naryab was semi-restored.

Tribes
The main tribe in Naryab is Badha Khel, which is a dispersed sub-tribe of Para Chamkani, now affiliated with the Bangash tribe. Their second occupies neighboring village Chapri Naryab, which is considered a part of the Orakzai tribe. The third is in the Ali Zai area of Orakzai Agency in the Shiite Belt, which is affiliated with Orakzai. The fourth is in the Mirali area of North Waziristan, named as Bado Khel which is affiliated with the Dawar tribe. Their main tribe is in Karman Area of Kurram Agency which is considered a sub-tribe of the Turi tribe i.e. a major Shiite tribe. Historically these are all of the Para Chamkani tribe.

History

The history of Naryab dates back to three hundred years, when this region was populated by migrants from Kurram Agency. The people migrated from Afghanistan when the  area was populated by the Bada Khel sub-tribe of Para Chamkani. These Bada Khels, after settling in Karman, began to convert to Shi'ism under the influence of Turis. According to the Bada Khels, some families who later migrated to Orakzai Agency also adopted Shiite faith. But the Bada Khel families migrated to Naryab and North Waziristan, changed only their tribal identity, remaining Ahl-e-Sunnat. The reason for the dispersal of this sub-tribe is unknown, but the most widely believed cause is their clash with other sub-tribes.
 Currently The Main Religion in Naryab is Sunni Muslim even though the Bangash is Shi'a.

Gallery

References

Union councils of Hangu District
Populated places in Hangu District, Pakistan